Lake Greenly (dual name: Puwanna) is a body of water in Australia.

Location
It is located near  Mount Greenly.

Hydrology

See also 
Greenly Island (South Australia)
Mount Greenly, South Australia

References

External links
Lake Greenly, Australia

Lakes of South Australia
Eyre Peninsula